Rosa Parks is a light rail station on the MAX Yellow Line in the Arbor Lodge neighborhood of Portland, Oregon. It is the 6th stop northbound on the Interstate MAX extension. It was originally named North Portland Boulevard, but following the city's decision in fall 2006 to rename Portland Blvd. to Rosa Parks Way, TriMet indicated it would support the change by renaming the station, at a then-undetermined future date.  The signs at the station continued to show the old name until Feb. 4, 2009, when a dedication ceremony was held, unveiling new signs renaming it as "Rosa Parks" station ("Way" being implied only). On TriMet's maps and other media, the station is shown as "N Rosa Parks Way".

The station is located in the median of Interstate Avenue near the intersection of N Rosa Parks Way. It has staggered side platforms, which sit on either side of the cross street, because the route runs around this station on Interstate Avenue in the median. Artistic elements at the station refer to Native American art.

Bus line connections
This station is served by the following bus line:
44 - Capitol Hwy/Mocks Crest

References

External links
Station information (with northbound ID number) from TriMet
Station information (with southbound ID number) from TriMet
MAX Light Rail Stations – more general TriMet page

MAX Light Rail stations
MAX Yellow Line
Railway stations in the United States opened in 2004
2004 establishments in Oregon
Arbor Lodge, Portland, Oregon
Memorials to Rosa Parks
Railway stations in Portland, Oregon